Abdul Karim Telgi (1961-2017) was a convicted Indian counterfeiter. He earned money by printing counterfeit stamp paper in India.

Early life
Telgi's mother was Shariefabee Ladsaab Telgi, and his father was an employee of Indian Railways. His father died while he was young. Telgi paid for his education at Sarvodaya Vidyalaya Khanapur, an English medium school, by selling fruits and vegetables on trains. Eventually, he moved to Saudi Arabia. Seven years later, he returned to India, when he began a counterfeiting career, originally focusing on fake passports. He started a business to export manpower to Saudi Arabia and opened a company, Arabian Metro Travels at  New Marine Lines. He used to create several fake documents that would facilitate laborers’ smooth passage at the airport even if their passport had an ECR (emigration check required) stamp or other issues that could raise red flags for immigration officials. This practice was called “pushing” in the parlance of manpower exporters.

Counterfeiting career
Telgi moved to more complex counterfeiting when he began to counterfeit stamp paper. He appointed 300 people as agents who sold the fakes to bulk purchasers, including banks, insurance companies, and stock brokerage firms. The size of the scam was estimated to be more than   One aspect of the scandal that caused much concern was that it required the involvement of many police officers and other government employees including Nikhil Kothari. Several police officers were implicated in the case. Pradip Sawant, then Deputy Commissioner of Police, Special Branch, Mumbai, was discharged but subsequently reinstated after being found innocent. Then police officer S M Mushrif, known for the book Who killed Karkare took decisive measures in this case.

On 17 January 2006, Telgi and several associates were sentenced to 30 years rigorous imprisonment. On 28 June 2007, Telgi was sentenced to rigorous imprisonment for 13 years for another aspect of the scandal. He was also fined . The Income Tax Department requested that Telgi's property be confiscated to pay the fine. He had been in jail for 13 years.

Personal life
Telgi used to go to dance bars and once showered Rs 90 lakh on one bar dancer in Topaz Bar at Grant Road, Mumbai. He was said to be in love with a bar dancer, Tarannumn Khan.

Death
Telgi was suffering from meningitis and died on 23 October 2017 at Victoria Hospital, Bengaluru. He was suffering from diabetes and hypertension for over 20 years, besides other ailments.

In popular culture
 Mudrank: The Stamp is a 2009 Indian Hindi-language thriller film directed by Shakir Shah based on the stamp scandal.
 Paper is a 2020 Indian web series by Ullu based on the stamp scandal and stars Rohit Roy as Telgi.
 Money Mafia is a documentary series that showcases the details of eight scandals in India. The first episode, Fake Stamp Papers, is about Telgi's scandal.
 Scam 2003 is an upcoming Indian web series based directed by Hansal Mehta and produced by Applause Entertainment. It is based on the 2003 stamp paper scam by Telgi and is a sequel to Scam 1992 about the 1992 Indian stock market scam by Harshad Mehta.

References

 1961 births
 2017 deaths
 Indian fraudsters
 Indian counterfeiters
 Indian prisoners and detainees
 Prisoners and detainees of Maharashtra
 People convicted of fraud
 Crime in Maharashtra
 Corruption in Maharashtra
21st-century Indian Muslims
21st-century Indian criminals
21st-century Indian people
People convicted of forgery